This is a chronological list of films produced in Korea while it was part of Japan as well as the united country of Korea before it officially became divided in September 1948. The first domestic Korean film was shown in 1919. The lists of Korean films are divided by period for political reasons. For later films of divided Korea (September 1948 to present) see the List of South Korean films and List of North Korean films. For an A-Z list of Korean-language films, see List of Korean-language films.

1910s
All films are silent film.

1920s
All films are silent film.

1930s
Films between 1931 and October 1935 are silent film.

1940s

References

External links
 Korean film at the Internet Movie Database

 
Lists of Korean films